Boštjan "Boki" Nachbar (born July 3, 1980) is a Slovenian former professional basketball player. A 2.06 m forward, he spent most of his career between the National Basketball Association (NBA) and the EuroLeague. Nachbar helped lead the Slovenian national basketball team to a fourth place at EuroBasket 2009.

Professional career

Europe
Nachbar started his professional career by joining the Olimpija Ljubljana basketball club in the 1997–98 season. He played with Olimpija in Europe's top level competition the EuroLeague, where he averaged 7 points and 2 rebounds per game. In the 2000–01 season he signed with Benetton Treviso basketball club, as the youngest Italian League player. With Benetton, he averaged 4 points and grabbed 2 rebounds in the EuroLeague. In the next season, he helped Benetton get to the Final Four of the EuroLeague, as he improved his statistics to 13 points and 4 rebounds per game. In his best game of the season, against Idea Slask Wroclaw, he scored 28 points, hitting 6 three-pointers. He won the Italian League championship and the Italian Supercup in 2002.

NBA
Nachbar was selected by the Houston Rockets as the 15th overall pick in the 2002 NBA Draft. He played for the Rockets for three seasons, but only averaged about 10 minutes per game. In 2004, he went to the New Orleans Hornets, where he averaged about 8 points in 21 minutes per game. During the 2004–05 NBA season, he scored 21 points against his former team, the Rockets, which was a career high. In the 2005–06 season, however, he had a difficult time getting off the bench once again was traded to the New Jersey Nets just before the trading deadline in exchange for Marc Jackson, Linton Johnson, and cash considerations. He had a great season with New Jersey as the team's 6th man, making many contributions to the club before they lost in the Eastern Conference semis to the Cleveland Cavaliers.

Nachbar's final NBA game was played on April 16th, 2008 in a 94 - 105 loss to the Boston Celtics where he recorded 11 points, 1 assist and 1 block.

Return to Europe
On July 20, 2008, Nachbar returned to Europe when he signed a 3-year €9.6 million euros net income contract with the Russian Superleague club Dynamo Moscow, giving him one of the most expensive contracts in European pro basketball history. The contract also included opt out clauses after each season. He averaged 16.1 points, 4.8 rebounds, 2.2 assists, and 1.4 steals in Europe's second level competition, the EuroCup, during the 2008-09 season.

Nachbar opted out of his contract with Dynamo Moscow on May 17, 2009. In July 2009, he signed a 2-year contract with a team option for the second year with the Turkish League club Efes Pilsen. He averaged 6.7 points and 1.9 rebounds per game in the EuroLeague in the 2009-10 season. In his second year with Efes, Nachbar improved his stats in the EuroLeague to 8.3 points and 2.8 rebounds. On June 24, 2011, Nachbar announced via Twitter that he won't stay for a third season with the team.

Nachbar started the 2011-12 season out due to an ankle injury. After recovering from the injury, he was mentioned as a potential reinforcement for several NBA teams. After not getting a contract in the NBA, Nachbar signed with Russian League team UNICS Kazan in January 2012, until the end of the season. He wasn't able to perform well in UNICS, averaging only 3.1 PPG in the Russian league.

He joined Brose Baskets Bamberg in July 2012. He had a successful season, leading the team to the EuroLeague Top 16, finishing as EuroLeague's second best scorer with 16.1 points per game. He also helped the team regain their Basketball Bundesliga title, as they won 3-0 in the finals series against EWE Baskets Oldenburg.

On July 23, 2013, Nachbar signed a two-year deal with FC Barcelona.

On August 18, 2015, he signed a one-year deal with Baloncesto Sevilla.

On May 14, 2018, Nachbar announced his retirement.

National team career
Nachbar was a member of the senior Slovenian national basketball team. He participated at EuroBasket 2003, EuroBasket 2005, EuroBasket 2009 and EuroBasket 2013. During the 2005 FIBA EuroBasket, he averaged 11 points and 5 rebounds per game. He was also a member of Slovenia's national team that played at the 2006 FIBA World Championship in Japan.

He was also a member of Slovenia's national team that played at the 2010 FIBA World Championship in Turkey. EuroBasket 2013, which took place in his homeland of Slovenia, was his last one before his retirement from the national team.

Post-playing career
Nachbar is hired as an international scout by the Detroit Pistons. Together with Anže Tomić and Boštjan Gorenc he runs the podcast Podrobnosti (eng. Details).

Personal life
He is married  and has two daughters, Tara and Ajda. His younger brother Grega is assistant coach of Premier A Slovenian Basketball League club Helios Suns.

Career statistics

NBA

Regular season

|-
| align="left" | 2002–03
| align="left" | Houston
| 14 || 1 || 5.5 || .355 || .200 || .500 || .8 || .2 || .1 || .1 || 2.1
|-
| align="left" | 2003–04
| align="left" | Houston
| 45 || 3 || 11.5 || .356 || .365 || .724 || 1.6 || .7 || .3 || .3 || 3.1
|-
| align="left" | 2004–05
| align="left" | Houston
| 16 || 2 || 12.8 || .349 || .476 || .750 || 1.9 || .6 || .1 || .0 || 3.1
|-
| align="left" | 2004–05
| align="left" | New Orleans
| 55 || 4 || 20.7 || .397 || .371 || .838 || 2.8 || 1.2 || .5 || .3 || 8.1
|-
| align="left" | 2005–06
| align="left" | NO/Oklahoma City
| 25 || 13 || 16.2 || .339 || .298 || .694 || 2.0 || .9 || .5 || .2 || 5.0
|-
| align="left" | 2005–06
| align="left" | New Jersey
| 11 || 0 || 8.8 || .375 || .143 || .625 || 1.0 || .5 || .3 || .0 || 2.8
|-
| align="left" | 2006–07
| align="left" | New Jersey
| 76 || 1 || 20.2 || .457 || .423 || .805 || 3.3 || .8 || .4 || .3 || 9.2
|-
| align="left" | 2007–08
| align="left" | New Jersey
| 75 || 1 || 22.1 || .402 || .359 || .786 || 3.5 || 1.2 || .6 || .3 || 9.8
|- class="sortbottom"
! style="text-align:center;" colspan="2"| Career
! 317 || 25 || 17.8 || .406 || .375 || .784 || 2.6 || .9 || .4 || .3 || 7.1

Playoffs

|-
| align="left" | 2004
| align="left" | Houston
| 5 || 0 || 8.2 || .444 || .333 || 1.000 || 1.2 || .4 || .2 || .0 || 2.8
|-
| align="left" | 2006
| align="left" | New Jersey
| 1 || 0 || 1.0 || .000 || .000 || .000 || .0 || .0 || .0 || .0 || .0
|-
| align="left" | 2007
| align="left" | New Jersey
| 12 || 0 || 23.4 || .421 || .375 || .955 || 2.9 || 1.5 || .6 || .1 || 9.9
|- class="sortbottom"
! style="text-align:center;" colspan="2"| Career
! 18 || 0 || 17.9 || .423 || .373 || .963 || 2.3 || 1.1 || .4 || .1 || 7.4

EuroLeague

|-
| align="left" | 2000–01
| align="left" | Benetton
| 12 || 1 || 9.0 || .429 || .429 || .640 || 1.8 || .8 || .5 || .2 || 4.3 || 4.7
|-
| align="left" | 2001–02
| align="left" | Benetton
| 21 || 16 || 25.4 || .475 || .333 || .778 || 3.7 || 1.4 || 1.0 || .2 || 12.4 || 11.3
|-
| align="left" | 2009–10
| align="left" | Efes Pilsen
| 15 || 2 || 16.4 || .477 || .355 || .844 || 1.9 || .7 || .3 || .5 || 6.7 || 6.7
|-
| align="left" | 2010–11
| align="left" | Efes Pilsen
| 15 || 0 || 19.3 || .418 || .379 || .822 || 2.8 || .3 || .4 || .3 || 8.3 || 6.6
|-
| align="left" | 2011–12
| align="left" | UNICS Kazan
| 7 || 0 || 14.1 || .370 || .500 || .833 || 2.4 || .6 || .3 || .1 || 4.0 || 3.9
|-
| align="left" | 2012–13
| align="left" | Brose Baskets
| 23 || 13 || 26.7 || .431 || .370 || .800 || 3.4 || 1.1 || .5 || .4 || 16.1 || 13.8
|-
| align="left" | 2013–14
| align="left" | Barcelona
| 28 || 6 || 18.3 || .437 || .360 || .733 || 3.0 || 1.0 || .4 || .1 || 7.9 || 6.4
|-
| align="left" | 2014–15
| align="left" | Barcelona
| 24 || 2 || 12.2 || .529 || .462 || .923 || 2.0 || .6 || .3 || .1 || 5.3 || 5.0
|- class="sortbottom"
! style="text-align:center;" colspan="2"| Career
! 146 || 40 || 18.6 || .449 || .378 || .788 || 2.7 || .9 || .5 || .2 || 8.8 || 7.8

See also
List of European basketball players in the United States

Notes

References

External links

 
 Boštjan Nachbar at acb.com
 Boštjan Nachbar at eurobasket.com
 Boštjan Nachbar at euroleague.net
 Boštjan Nachbar at fiba.com
 Boštjan Nachbar at legabasket.it
 Boštjan Nachbar at nba.com
 Boštjan Nachbar at tblstat.net
 

1980 births
Living people
2006 FIBA World Championship players
2010 FIBA World Championship players
Anadolu Efes S.K. players
BC Dynamo Moscow players
BC UNICS players
Brose Bamberg players
Real Betis Baloncesto players
Detroit Pistons scouts
Slovenian expatriate basketball people in Russia
FC Barcelona Bàsquet players
Houston Rockets draft picks
Houston Rockets players
KK Olimpija players
Liga ACB players
National Basketball Association players from Slovenia
National Basketball Association scouts from Europe
New Jersey Nets players
New Orleans Hornets players
Pallacanestro Treviso players
Power forwards (basketball)
Slovenian basketball scouts
Slovenian expatriate basketball people in Germany
Slovenian expatriate basketball people in Italy
Slovenian expatriate basketball people in Spain
Slovenian expatriate basketball people in the United States
Slovenian men's basketball players
Small forwards
Sportspeople from Slovenj Gradec